Anomaloglossus murisipanensis is a species of frog in the family Aromobatidae. It is endemic to Venezuela where it is known from its type locality, the Murisipán-tepui in the Bolívar state. It is known from only one specimen collected under a rock in tropical montane forest.

References

murisipanensis
Amphibians of Venezuela
Endemic fauna of Venezuela
Taxonomy articles created by Polbot
Amphibians described in 1997
Amphibians of the Tepuis